Florida's 13th congressional district is an electoral district for the U.S. Congress on Florida's Gulf Coast, assigned to Pinellas County. The district includes Largo, Clearwater, and Palm Harbor. In the 2020 redistricting cycle, most of St. Petersburg facing Tampa Bay was redistricted into the 14th district, while the rest of Pinellas County formerly in the 12th district became included in the 13th district.

From 2003 to 2012, it encompassed all of Sarasota, DeSoto, and Hardee Counties; as well as most of Manatee County, except for a small northern coastal portion that was then located in the neighboring 11th congressional district. It also included a small section of Charlotte County. Most of that district is now the 16th congressional district, while the current 13th covers most of what had been the 10th district from 1993 to 2013.

The district is currently represented by Republican Anna Paulina Luna.

2015 court-ordered redistricting 
In July 2015 the Florida Supreme Court overturned the boundaries of the state's congressional districts, ruling that "the maps were the product of an unconstitutional political gerrymandering." It expressed its distrust of lawmakers and "provided detailed instructions on how to repair the flawed map in time for the 2016 election."

With the future of the boundaries of the district undetermined, the Republican Party may abandon it. This was where (under slightly different boundaries) William C. Cramer was elected to Congress, and he helped build the Republican Party in Florida and the South. He held office from 1954 to 1970. Republican C.W. Bill Young essentially represented the district from 1971 to his death in 2013. But demographics have continued to change, and more recently it has been a swing district. Several Democrats may be interested in running for the seat.

List of members representing the district

Recent election results from presidential races

Election results

2002

2004

2006

Election officials certified Buchanan as the winner of the race over Jennings by 369 votes. Buchanan was declared the winner after a mandatory recount and analysis of alleged voting machine errors in the race. The primary controversy in this race was that over 18,000 ballots (or roughly one in six) cast in Sarasota County apparently did not register a vote for this race, far higher than in the two previous elections involving Jan Schneider, but lower than the undervote in 2000. Sarasota County voted for Jennings by a six-point margin. Jennings refused to concede the race and pursued administrative and legal challenges to the result, including an appeal for an investigation of the election with the House Administration Committee. Preliminary results from an investigation by Congress's Government Accountability Office concluded that there was no evidence that the voting machines caused the high undervote, but that inadequate testing made it impossible to prove their complete reliability. Sarasota County has since moved to optical scanned paper ballots as a result of a 2006 referendum vote.

According to a statistical study published in 2008, the missing votes were caused by the ballot screen layout. The authors' best estimate on what the result would have been, had this problem not occurred, gave victory to Jennings at a 99.9% confidence level, and a mean margin of victory for her of 639 votes.

2008

2010

2012

2014 (special)

The district's seat was vacated following the death of Bill Young. A special election was held on March 11, 2014 to replace him. The election was won by Republican David Jolly with 48.52% of the vote over one-time gubernatorial candidate Democrat Alex Sink's 46.64% and Libertarian candidate Lucas Overby's 4.84%.

2014

2016

2018

2020

2022

References

 Congressional Biographical Directory of the United States 1774–present

External links
Voting inquiry finds reasons to dig deeper (Sarasota Herald-Tribune, August 4, 2007)
Congressional task force to begin investigating contested Florida 13 election. (The Bradenton Herald, March 31, 2007)
Congressional Republicans act to block Congressional Task Force slated to begin investigation into Florida 13. (Sarasota Herald-Tribune, March 28, 2007)
Memo on voting machines "misfiled" by Kathy Dent's office. (Sarasota Herald-Tribune, March 17, 2007)
People for the American Way Statement on Newly Revealed ES&S Memo on Possible Machine Malfunction. (People for the American Way, March 15, 2007)
August 2006 Memo from Elections Systems and Software warning Florida Supervisors of Elections of a response time issue on their iVotronics touchscreen voting systems.
Sarasota: Could a Bug Have Lost Votes? (Professor Ed Felten, February 27, 2006)
Software Review and Security Analysis of the ES&S iVotronic 8.0.1.2 Voting Machine Firmware, Final Report. (Florida Department of State, February 2007) 
Affidavit by Clare Ward-Jenkins, poll worker in Precinct 14, Sarasota County.  Ms. Ward-Jenkins' affidavit details her encounters with a bug that repeatedly cleared votes cast for Democratic Congressional candidate, Christine Jennings., January 19, 2007
Analysis: Undervoted ballots heavily favored Democrats. (Orlando Sentinel, November 22, 2006)
Buchanan declared winner; rival Jennings sues (Sarasota Herald-Tribune, November 21, 2006)
Christine Jennings' "Complaint to Contest Election" (Filed in Florida Court, November 20, 2006)
Sarasota County Electronic Ballot Screenshots (Posted on The BradBlog, November 20, 2006)
Christine Jennings' web site.
Vern Buchanan's Congressional web site.

13
1973 establishments in Florida